A glucogenic amino acid (or glucoplastic amino acid) is an amino acid that can be converted into glucose through gluconeogenesis. This is in contrast to the ketogenic amino acids, which are converted into ketone bodies.

The production of glucose from glucogenic amino acids involves these amino acids being converted to alpha keto acids and then to glucose, with both processes occurring in the liver. This mechanism predominates during catabolysis, rising as fasting and starvation increase in severity.

In humans, the glucogenic amino acids are:

 Alanine
 Arginine
 Asparagine
 Aspartic acid
 Cysteine
 Glutamic acid
 Glutamine
 Glycine
 Histidine
 Methionine
 Proline
 Serine
 Valine

Amino acids that are both glucogenic and ketogenic (mnemonic "PITTT"):

 Phenylalanine
 Isoleucine
 Threonine
 Tryptophan
 Tyrosine

Only leucine and lysine are not glucogenic (they are only ketogenic).

See also 
 Glycolysis
 Ketogenic amino acid
 List of standard amino acids
 Metabolism

References

External links 
 Amino acid metabolism
 Chapter on Amino acid catabolism in Biochemistry by Jeremy Berg, John Tymoczko, Lubert Stryer. Fourth ed. by Lubert Stryer.  Accessed 2007-03-17
 Amino acid metabolism

Amino acids
Glucogenic amino acids
Nitrogen cycle
Medical mnemonics